Zebrzydowa-Wieś   is a village in the administrative district of Gmina Nowogrodziec, within Bolesławiec County, Lower Silesian Voivodeship, in south-western Poland. 

The village has a population of about 1,500.

References

Villages in Bolesławiec County